SeeClickFix is a digital communications system company founded and based in Downtown New Haven, Connecticut. The company runs a website and app which assist users in communicating with local governments about non-emergency issues. SeeClickFix was established in 2008, with co-founder Ben Berkowitz as chief executive officer.

The company was acquired by CivicPlus in 2019.

Website 
SeeClickFix is an issue reporting platform which allows people to report non-emergency neighborhood issues to local government bodies, assisting city staff.  The tool has a free mobile app that maps user comments. Users may add comments, suggest courses of action, or add video and picture documentation. Users can receive notifications based on selected areas and keywords. The site also allows anonymous reporting. According to the company, about 300 municipalities subscribed to it in 2017.

News outlets following stories from SeeClickFix have prompted responses from local government.

References

External links 
 

Collaborative mapping
Companies based in New Haven, Connecticut
Open government in the United States
Software companies established in 2008
Online publishing companies of the United States
Software companies based in Connecticut
American companies established in 2008
2008 establishments in Connecticut
Software companies of the United States